Petra Robnik (born 16 October 1984 in Blejska Dobrava, Jesenice, SR Slovenia, SFR Yugoslavia) is a Slovenian alpine skier.

A member of SK Jesenice, she competes in all disciplines.

Robnik represented Slovenia at the 2006 Winter Olympics. She was placed 25th in the downhill, 21st in the combined and 29th in the Super-G.

Her World Cup was debut in 2004 in slalom in Maribor. So far, her best result is 8th place in Super-combined (Tarvisio, 2007).

Her best result in European cup is 8th place in slalom (Lenggries, 2008).

Results in the Slovenian national championship

External links 
 
 

Slovenian female alpine skiers
Living people
1984 births
Olympic alpine skiers of Slovenia
Alpine skiers at the 2006 Winter Olympics
Universiade medalists in alpine skiing
People from the Municipality of Jesenice
Universiade bronze medalists for Slovenia
Competitors at the 2007 Winter Universiade